Jörg Imberger  (born September 10, 1942) is an Australian civil engineer.

Imberger studied civil engineering at the University of Melbourne, graduating with a bachelor's degree in 1963. He pursued further study in the subject at the University of Western Australia, completing a master's degree in 1966. Imberger earned his doctorate in civil engineering with specialization in coastal engineering from the University of California, Berkeley in 1970. Imberger began teaching as an associate professor at Berkeley in 1976. He returned to Australia to assume the Winthrop Professorship at the University of Western Australia in 1979. After his retirement in 2015, Imberger accepted an adjunct professorship at the University of Miami. 

Over the course of his career, Imberger has received the Peter Nicol Russell Memorial Medal (1995), the Stockholm Water Prize (2001), and the A.C. Redfield Lifetime Achievement Award (2007), among others. He became a member of the Order of Australia in 1992, and a fellow of the Australian Academy of Science in 1993. Imberger has been elected to an equivalent honor within the Australian Academy of Technological Sciences and Engineering, as well as the Institute of Engineers, Australia, American Geophysical Union (2007), and Royal Academy of Engineering (2008). In 2006, he was elected a member of the National Academy of Engineering for contributions to and international leadership in the environmental fluid dynamics of lakes, reservoirs, estuaries, and coastal seas.

References

External links

1942 births
Living people
Australian civil engineers
Environmental engineers
University of Western Australia alumni
Academic staff of the University of Western Australia
UC Berkeley College of Engineering alumni
UC Berkeley College of Engineering faculty
University of Melbourne alumni
Members of the Order of Australia
Foreign associates of the National Academy of Engineering
Fellows of the Australian Academy of Technological Sciences and Engineering
Fellows of the Australian Academy of Science
Fellows of the American Geophysical Union
Fellows of the Royal Academy of Engineering
Australian expatriates in the United States
20th-century Australian engineers
21st-century Australian engineers